Santosh Araswilli is an Indian professional table tennis player who currently plays with Cambados Tenis De Mesa in Spain.

References

Living people
Indian male table tennis players
Year of birth missing (living people)